Mohammad Farogh Naseem is a Pakistani politician and barrister  who served as the Federal Minister of Law and Justice until 2 April 2022. He is serving as member of the Senate of Pakistan. He has previously served as Advocate General of Sindh.

Early life and education

He has completed his graduation in Bachelor of Laws (LLB) from the University of Wales, Master of Laws (LLM) from the London School of Economics and Doctor of Philosophy (PhD) in comparative constitutional law from the University of London.

Political career
He was elected to the Senate of Pakistan from Sindh against technocrats seat on March 12, 2012. In March 2018, he was re-elected on general seat from 
Sindh.

On 20 August 2018, he was sworn in as Federal Minister of Law and Justice in the federal cabinet of Prime Minister Imran Khan.

He resigned on 26 November 2019, and presented his resignation in federal cabinet to represent the government in a case regarding Army Chief Gen Qamar Javed Bajwa's tenure extension in the Supreme Court

On 29 November 2019, he was again sworn in as Federal Minister of Law and Justice in the federal cabinet of Prime Minister Imran Khan.

He resigned on 1 June 2020, and presented his resignation to Prime Minister Imran Khan to represent Federal Government regarding Justice Qazi Faez Isa's case in Supreme Court.

On 24 July 2020,  he was again sworn in as Federal Minister of Law and Justice in the federal cabinet of Prime Minister Imran Khan for third time.
Law Minister Farogh Naseem, who paid over Rs35 million, was the highest tax-paying member of the Senate in 2018.

Family

His father, Mohammad Naseem (late), was also a practicing lawyer, and the late Justice M.B. Ahmad, an ICS officer who also served as the first secretary of the Constituent Assembly of Pakistan; before being elevated as a judge of the Sindh High Court, was his paternal uncle.

References

Living people
1969 births
Pakistani lawyers
Pakistani barristers
Law Ministers of Pakistan
Pakistani senators (14th Parliament)
Muttahida Qaumi Movement politicians
Alumni of the University of Wales
Alumni of the London School of Economics
Alumni of the University of London
Lawyers from Karachi
Vice Chairmen of the Pakistan Bar Council